Several ships have been named  :

 JDS Kaede (PF-13, PF-293), a Kusu-class patrol frigate of the Japan Maritime Self-Defense Force, formerly USS Newport (PF-27)

See also 
Kaede (disambiguation)

Imperial Japanese Navy ship names
Japanese Navy ship names